Goodman Manufacturing is an American company operating as an independent subsidiary   of Daikin Group, the world's largest manufacturer of heating, ventilation and air conditioning products and systems. The company, founded in 1975 and based in Waller, Texas, manufactures residential heating and cooling systems.

Goodman is located just outside Houston,Texas, in the $417 million Daikin Texas Technology Park.

History
Goodman Manufacturing was founded by HVAC dealer, Harold V. Goodman, in 1975 as a manufacturer of flexible air ducts and plastic blade registers. However, he turned his sights to fulfill a dream of manufacturing affordable HVAC equipment for households across the United States of America and beyond.

In 1982, the company acquired Janitrol and entered the HVAC market, expanding its product offering in 1986 to include gas heating products.

Harold V. Goodman died in 1996 and was succeeded by Frank H. Murray who became chairman and CEO in April 1996.

In 1997, Murray initiated and spearheaded the Goodman acquisition of Raytheon Appliances, the predecessor of Amana Corporation, a manufacturer of appliances and HVAC units.  Four years later, in 2001, Goodman separated its appliances business from its HVAC business and would sell the appliances business to Maytag Corporation.

In 2004, Goodman was acquired by Apollo Management, a private equity firm, for approximately $1.43 billion.  Just a year and a half later, in April 2006, Goodman completed an initial public offering, listing on the New York Stock Exchange.

In October 2007, Goodman agreed to be acquired by Hellman & Friedman, a San Francisco-based private equity firm, in a $1.8 billion transaction.  In August 2012, Hellman & Friedman agreed to sell Goodman Global to Japan's Daikin Industries Ltd. for $3.7 billion.

In 2015, Daikin commenced construction of the state-of-the-art Daikin Texas Technology Park campus near Houston, Texas. This project, costing over $400 million, was the largest investment made in Daikin’s 90-year history. In October 2016, operations at the new facility ramped up and the first Goodman air conditioner and gas furnace units came off the line.

In 2017, the construction of the huge facility concluded to consolidate Goodman’s HVAC manufacturing, engineering, logistics, and customer support under one, very large 4.1 million square foot roof.

In 2017, Goodman acquired property technology (proptech) company Motili, to expand its HVAC market reach.

In September 2019, the company closed a factory in Fayetteville, Tennessee and laid off about 700 workers. The closure of the factory is part of a long-term plan to relocate manufacturing jobs to a new industrial facility in Texas.

Brands
 Amana Heating and Cooling

References

External links

UNbeaten Hepa Air Purifier
How Goodman Global’s Deal Got Done

Daikin
Cooling technology
Manufacturing companies established in 1975
Heating, ventilation, and air conditioning companies
Manufacturing companies based in Houston
Private equity portfolio companies
Apollo Global Management companies
1975 establishments in Texas
2006 initial public offerings
2004 mergers and acquisitions
2007 mergers and acquisitions
2012 mergers and acquisitions
American subsidiaries of foreign companies